Gordon McGhie (14 October 1907 – c. 1975) was a rugby union player who represented Australia. He rose to prominence in the late 1920s / early 1930s as a flying winger when the Queensland Rugby Union reformed after a ten-year hiatus. 

McGhie, a wing, was born in Brisbane, Queensland and claimed a total of 3 international rugby caps for Australia.

References

Australian rugby union players
Australia international rugby union players
1907 births
1975 deaths
Rugby union players from Brisbane
Rugby union wings